Noblesville High School is a public high school in Noblesville, Indiana, United States. NHS serves students in grades 9 through 12, and graduated its first class in 1876.

Its attendance boundary includes much of Noblesville.

Demographics
The demographic breakdown of the 3,001 students enrolled in 2021-2022 was:
Male - 50%
Female - 50%
Native American/Alaskan - 0.1%
Asian/Pacific islanders - 0.1%
Black - 3.1%
Hispanic - 5.6%
White - 85.6%
Multiracial - 3.1%

21% of the students were eligible for free or reduced-cost lunch.

Athletics

Noblesville is an original member of the Indiana High School Athletic Association, one of fifteen schools listed as charter members in the IHSAA Handbook of 1928.

Noblesville has won thirteen state championships:
Girls' basketball: 1986–87, 2021-22
Girls' cross country: 2022
Boys' golf: 1997-98, 1998–99
Girls' golf: 1986-87, 1987–88
Boys' track: 1912–13
Boys' baseball: 2013-2014
Girls' soccer: 2019,2022
Boys’ soccer: 2021, 2022

In 2020, NHS announced plans to build a new sports complex, replacing one constructed in 1969.

Performing arts
NHS has four competitive show choirs: the mixed-gender "NHS Singers", the all-female "New Dimension" and "Sensation" and the all-male "MaleTonez".
NHS is also known for their award winning Bands, regularly achieving gold rating at ISSMA contests.

Notable alumni
 David Boudia - Olympic athlete, gold medal winner in 10 meter platform diving at the 2012 Summer Olympics
 Bryan Clauson - driver in professional motor sports, IndyCar, NASCAR
 Cami schott - sports anchor and reporter for Fox Sports South
 Brandon Knight - NFL player
 Ashley Prange - former LPGA golfer
 Wes Whisler - former MLB pitcher, most recently for the Chicago White Sox
 Chase Wyatt - Indiana University Football 2019-2021 (Academic All-B1G, Punter/Holder). Grad Transfer 2022 Ball State Football 
David Weglarz - Best Craft Distiller in the Country *2016, 2018, 2018, 2020 (https://americancraftspirits.org/programs/judging/2016-american-craft-spirits-awards/)
(https://americancraftspirits.org/programs/judging/2018-american-craft-spirits-awards/#link_tab-1501695235949-4-8)
(https://distilling.com/news/adi-announces-the-2020-craft-spirits-awards/)

See also
 List of high schools in Indiana

References

External links
 
 Noblesville's schools

Public high schools in Indiana
Schools in Hamilton County, Indiana
Noblesville, Indiana